The men's 4x400 metres relay competition at the 2010 IAAF World Indoor Championships was held at the ASPIRE Dome on 13 and 14 March.

In the first heat the United States and Jamaica took the top two spots as expected, shortly followed by the Dominican Republic in a national record time of 3:06.30. In the second heat, a clash between Vladimir Antmanis and Marcin Marciniszyn resulted in a baton drop by Russia, which eventually cost them a place in the final. Belgium won heat two but the initial second placers Botswana (which ran an African record of 3:09.60) were later disqualified for a baton exchange outside of the legal zone. The Bahamas benefited from the disqualification and the Dominican Republic and Great Britain entered the final as the fastest losers.

In the final the following day, the United States eased to victory courtesy of strong running from Jamaal Torrance on the first leg and a series of good changeovers – their world leading time of 3:03.40 was three seconds ahead of the rest of the field. Belgium were the next team to finish, scoring a national record 3:06.94 on the way to the country's first ever medal in the event. The other teams suffered a more hectic race: the Bahamas' chances were spoilt when Andretti Bain went down on the track with an injury and Jamaica had a similar fate as Sanjay Ayre pulled up with an injury at the same moment. A poor, late baton exchange between Félix Sánchez and Yoel Tapia on the anchor leg caused them to be disqualified although they finished behind third Great Britain in any case.

Medalists

Records

Schedule

Results

Heats
Qualification: First 2 of each heat (Q) plus the 2 fastest times (q) advance to the final.

Final

References

Heats Results
Final Result

Relay 4x400 metres
4 × 400 metres relay at the World Athletics Indoor Championships